Route 715 is a  long local highway in Queens County, New Brunswick. Its western terminus is in Jemseg at Route 695 near its interchange with Route 2 (the Trans-Canada Highway) and its eastern terminus is in Coles Island at Route 10 and Route 112. It is signed as an east–west highway although its westernmost portion along the Saint John River runs nearly due north and south.

Route description
The route starts at the intersection of Route 10 and Route 112 north of Coles Island, where it travels south along the east bank of the Canaan River. It travels through a mostly forested area past Chambres Corner and Washademoak where it takes a sharp turn west at Pattersons Cove. From here, road continues west to Picketts Cove where it passes around the cove and enters the community of Picketts Cove. The road continues southwest around Fowlers Cove where it intersects with Route 695 in Cambridge-Narrows. Continuing, the road passes through McDonald Corner, Central Cambridge, and Lower Cambridge. At this point, the road takes a sharp turn northwest and heads towards Lower Jemseg. The final stretch passes by Dykeman Lake before ending at Jemseg at the western terminus of Route 695 on the Saint John River.

History

Major junctions

See also

References

715
715